Adelptes is a genus of beetles in the family Mordellidae, containing the following species:

 Adelptes clavipalpis Franciscolo, 1965
 Adelptes vadoni

References

Mordellinae
Mordellidae genera